North Dakota Highway 1804 (ND 1804) is a state highway in the U.S. state of North Dakota. ND 1804 and ND 1806 were named to reflect the years of Lewis and Clark's travels through the area, and together constitute the portion of the Lewis and Clark Trail that runs through North Dakota along the northeast and southwest sides of Lake Sakakawea and the Missouri River, respectively.

Route description
Highway 1804 begins at the border between North Dakota and South Dakota near Pollock, South Dakota, and continues uninterrupted along the north east side of the Missouri River through Emmons, Burleigh, McLean, Mountrail, and Williams counties. At the intersection of Bismarck Expressway in Bismarck, the highway temporarily splits into a separate northbound route (concurrent with 9th Street) and southbound route (concurrent with 7th Street) until both roads terminate at E Boulevard Avenue in front of the North Dakota State Capitol grounds. Further north in Bismarck, ND 1804 intersects Interstate 94, from which it runs concurrent with US 83 for a short distance.

Just north of Bismarck, ND 1804 diverges from US 83 to closely follow the Missouri River. It once again runs concurrent with US 83 until just northeast of Lake Sakakawea, where ND 1804 permanently diverges west to closely follow the lake. At Williston, a brief concurrence with US 2 and US 85 begins and ends as ND 1804 dips south alongside the Missouri River to meet its final terminus at Montana Secondary Highway 327 in the Fort Union Trading Post National Historic Site.

Major intersections

References

1804
Transportation in Emmons County, North Dakota
Transportation in Burleigh County, North Dakota
Transportation in McLean County, North Dakota
Transportation in Mountrail County, North Dakota
Transportation in Williams County, North Dakota